Klaus Sulzenbacher (born 3 February 1965 in Kitzbühel, Austria) is a former Nordic combined skier.

Between 1983 and 1991 he won 14 World Cup competitions, and also won the World Cup twice. At the 1988 Winter Olympics in Calgary, he won silver in the 15 km individual competition, and bronze in the 3 x 10 km team competition. At the 1991 FIS Nordic World Ski Championships he finished second in the 15 km individual competition, and won in the 3 x 10 km team event. At the 1992 Winter Olympics in Albertville, he won bronze medals in both the 15 km individual and 3 x 10 km team competitions.

Sulzenbacher grew up in Kitzbuehel, Tyrol, which is often considered Austria's mecca of Alpine skiing. That he went to train in Nordic skiing in his youth, and not in Alpine styles, is remarkable given that at the time virtually the entire well-funded Austrian Ski Federation system was geared towards Alpine ski racing. Sulzenbacher must be credited for breaking new ground. As Austria's first successful Nordic skier, Sulzenbacher is regarded as cornerstone for the successes of both Mario Stecher and Felix Gottwald. With four Olympic medals, he is among Austria's most successful Olympic competitors. Following his retirement from competition, he now works as a physiotherapist in Stams.

External links

1965 births
Living people
Austrian male Nordic combined skiers
Olympic Nordic combined skiers of Austria
Olympic silver medalists for Austria
Olympic bronze medalists for Austria
Nordic combined skiers at the 1984 Winter Olympics
Nordic combined skiers at the 1988 Winter Olympics
Nordic combined skiers at the 1992 Winter Olympics
FIS Nordic Combined World Cup winners
People from Kitzbühel
Sportspeople from Tyrol (state)
Olympic medalists in Nordic combined
FIS Nordic World Ski Championships medalists in Nordic combined
Medalists at the 1988 Winter Olympics
Medalists at the 1992 Winter Olympics